The 2020 Cheltenham Gold Cup (known as the Magners Gold Cup for sponsorship reasons) was the 92nd annual running of the Cheltenham Gold Cup horse race and was held at Cheltenham Racecourse, Gloucestershire, England, on 13 March 2020.

The race was won for the second year in a row by Al Boum Photo, ridden by Paul Townend and trained by Willie Mullins. The race was held during the COVID-19 pandemic in the United Kingdom, which later caused controversy as some scientists believed the meeting led to an increase of infections and deaths.

Details
 Sponsor: Magners
 Winner's prize money: £351,687.50
 Going: Good to Soft
 Number of runners: 12
 Winner's time: 6m 50.38s

References

External links
 2020 Cheltenham Gold Cup at Racing Post

Cheltenham Gold Cup
 2020
Cheltenham Gold Cup
2020s in Gloucestershire
Cheltenham Gold Cup
COVID-19 pandemic in the United Kingdom